The 2003 Open Canada Cup was the 6th edition of the Canadian Professional Soccer League's open league cup tournament running from mid May through early September. London City defeated Metro Lions 4-2 in a penalty shootout in the final played at Cove Road Stadium, London, Ontario. The victory gave London their first piece of silverware and brought an end to the Ottawa Wizards Canada Cup dynasty. The 2003 edition of the Canada Cup was a historical milestone achieved by the CPSL by opening the tournament to all Canadian professional and amateur clubs in order to provide a potential candidate for the CONCACAF Champions' Cup and a $10,000 reward for the champion. The last time a Canadian club competed in the Champions' Cup was in the 1976 CONCACAF Champions' Cup represented by Toronto Italia of the National Soccer League the predecessor league of the CPSL.

The tournament featured several clubs from the Ontario League, Ottawa Carleton Soccer League, Western Ontario League, and the Ligue de Soccer Elite Quebec. The Ontario amateur clubs began the tournament in the preliminary rounds and the CPSL & LSEQ clubs were given a bye to the second round. While defending champions Ottawa Wizards received an automatic bye to the quarterfinals. For the second straight year London City were awarded the hosting rights to the finals which granted them a wild card match if they were defeated in the earlier rounds. Despite the CPSL's successful attempt in organizing a national tournament the competition was without controversy. The controversy stemmed from a dispute involving Ottawa Wizards with the CPSL's board of directors over the hosting rights for the finals. After failing to confirm their participation in the later rounds of the tournament the league removed Ottawa from the competition, and in return Ottawa threatened to obtain an injunction. The dispute eventually reached the Superior Court of Justice which ruled in favor of the CPSL decision, and allowed the tournament to precede without the participation of Ottawa.

Qualification

First round

Second round

Quarter-final

Wild Card Game

Semi-final

Final

Man of the Match:
Justin Medeiros (London City)

Top scorers

References 

Open Canada Cup
Open Canada Cup
Open Canada Cup